

Events

Pre-1600
69 – The Roman legions in Germania Superior refuse to swear loyalty to Galba. They rebel and proclaim Vitellius as emperor.
 366 – The Alemanni cross the frozen Rhine in large numbers, invading the Roman Empire.
 533 – Mercurius becomes Pope John II, the first pope to adopt a new name upon elevation to the papacy.
1492 – Reconquista: The Emirate of Granada, the last Moorish stronghold in Spain, surrenders.

1601–1900
1680 – Trunajaya rebellion: Amangkurat II of Mataram and his bodyguards execute the rebel leader Trunajaya.
1777 – American Revolutionary War: American forces under the command of George Washington repulsed a British attack at the Battle of the Assunpink Creek near Trenton, New Jersey.
1788 – Georgia becomes the fourth state to ratify the United States Constitution.
1791 – Big Bottom massacre in the Ohio Country, North America, marking the beginning of the Northwest Indian War.
1818 – The British Institution of Civil Engineers is founded by a group of six engineers; Thomas Telford would later become its first president.
1865 – Uruguayan War: The Siege of Paysandú ends as the Brazilians and Coloradans capture Paysandú, Uruguay.
1900 – American statesman and diplomat John Hay announces the Open Door Policy to promote trade with China.
1900 – Chicago Canal opens.

1901–present
1920 – The second Palmer Raid, ordered by the US Department of Justice, results in 6,000 suspected communists and anarchists being arrested and held without trial.
1921 – World premiere of the science fiction play R.U.R. by the Czech writer Karel Čapek in a theater in Hradec Králové.
1941 – World War II: The Cardiff Blitz severely damages the cathedral in Cardiff, Wales.
1942 – The Federal Bureau of Investigation (FBI) obtains the conviction of 33 members of a German spy ring headed by Fritz Joubert Duquesne in the largest espionage case in United States history; Also known as the Duquesne Spy Ring.
  1942   – World War II: Manila is captured by Japanese forces, enabling them to control the Philippines.
1949 – Luis Muñoz Marín is inaugurated as the first democratically elected Governor of Puerto Rico.
1954 – India establishes its highest civilian awards, the Bharat Ratna and the Padma Vibhushan.
1955 – Following the assassination of the Panamanian president José Antonio Remón Cantera, his deputy, José Ramón Guizado, takes power, but is quickly deposed after his involvement in Cantera's death is discovered.
1959 – Luna 1, the first spacecraft to reach the vicinity of the Moon and to orbit the Sun, is launched by the Soviet Union.
1963 – Vietnam War: The Viet Cong wins its first major victory, at the Battle of Ap Bac.
1967 – Ronald Reagan, past movie actor and future President of the United States, is sworn in as Governor of California.
1971 – The second Ibrox disaster kills 66 fans at a Rangers-Celtic association football (soccer) match.
1974 – United States President Richard Nixon signs a bill lowering the maximum U.S. speed limit to 55 MPH in order to conserve gasoline during an OPEC embargo.
1975 – At the opening of a new railway line, a bomb blast at Samastipur, Bihar, India, fatally wounds Lalit Narayan Mishra, Minister of Railways.
  1975   – The Federal Rules of Evidence are approved by the United States Congress.
1976 – The Gale of January 1976 begins, resulting in coastal flooding around the southern North Sea coasts, affecting countries from Ireland to Yugoslavia and causing at least 82 deaths and US$1.3 billion in damage.
1978 – On the orders of the President of Pakistan, Muhammad Zia-ul-Haq, paramilitary forces opened fire on peaceful protesting workers in Multan, Pakistan; it is known as 1978 massacre at Multan Colony Textile Mills.
1981 – One of the largest investigations by a British police force ends when serial killer Peter Sutcliffe, the "Yorkshire Ripper", is arrested in Sheffield, South Yorkshire.
1988 – Condor Flugdienst Flight 3782 crashes near Seferihisar, Turkey, killing 16 people.
1991 – Sharon Pratt Dixon becomes the first African American woman mayor of a major city and first woman Mayor of the District of Columbia.
1993 – Sri Lankan Civil War: The Sri Lanka Navy kill 35–100 civilians on the Jaffna Lagoon.
2004 – Stardust successfully flies past Comet Wild 2, collecting samples that are returned to Earth.

Births

Pre-1600
 869 – Yōzei, Japanese emperor (d. 949)
1462 – Piero di Cosimo, Italian painter (d. 1522)
1509 – Henry of Stolberg, German nobleman (d. 1572)

1601–1900
1642 – Mehmed IV, Ottoman sultan (d. 1693)
1647 – Nathaniel Bacon, English-American rebel leader (d. 1676)
1699 – Osman III, Ottoman sultan (d. 1757)
1713 – Marie Dumesnil, French actress (d. 1803)
1727 – James Wolfe, English general (d. 1759)
1732 – František Brixi, Czech organist and composer (d. 1771)
1777 – Christian Daniel Rauch, German sculptor and educator (d. 1857)
1803 – Guglielmo Libri Carucci dalla Sommaja, Italian mathematician and academic (d. 1869)
1822 – Rudolf Clausius, Polish-German physicist and mathematician (d. 1888)
1827 – Pyotr Semyonov-Tyan-Shansky, Russian geographer and statistician (d. 1914)
1833 – Frederick A. Johnson, American banker and politician (d. 1893)
1836 – Mendele Mocher Sforim, Russian author (d. 1917)
  1836   – Queen Emma of Hawaii (d. 1885)
1837 – Mily Balakirev, Russian pianist and composer (d. 1910)
1857 – M. Carey Thomas, American educator and activist (d. 1935)
1860 – Dugald Campbell Patterson, Canadian engineer (d. 1931)
  1860   – William Corless Mills, American historian and curator (d. 1928)
1866 – Gilbert Murray, Australian-English playwright and scholar (d. 1957)
1870 – Ernst Barlach, German sculptor and playwright (d. 1938)
  1870   – Tex Rickard, American boxing promoter and businessman (d. 1929)
1873 – Antonie Pannekoek, Dutch astronomer and theorist (d. 1960)
  1873   – Thérèse of Lisieux, French nun and saint (d. 1897)
1878 – Mannathu Padmanabha Pillai, Indian activist, founded the Nair Service Society (d. 1970)
1884 – Ben-Zion Dinur, Russian-Israeli historian and politician, 4th Israeli Minister of Education (d. 1973)
1885 – Gordon Flowerdew, Canadian lieutenant, Victoria Cross recipient (d. 1918)
1886 – Apsley Cherry-Garrard, English explorer and author (d. 1959)
1889 – Bertram Stevens, Australian accountant and politician, 25th Premier of New South Wales (d. 1973)
1891 – Giovanni Michelucci, Italian architect and urban planner, designed the Firenze Santa Maria Novella railway station (d. 1990)
1892 – Seiichiro Kashio, Japanese tennis player (d. 1962)
1895 – Folke Bernadotte, Swedish diplomat (d. 1948)
1896 – Dziga Vertov, Polish-Russian director and screenwriter (d. 1954)
  1896   – Lawrence Wackett, Australian commander and engineer (d. 1982)
1897 – Theodore Plucknett, English legal historian (d. 1965)
1900 – Una Ledingham, British physician, known for research on diabetes in pregnancy (d. 1965)

1901–present
1901 – Bob Marshall, American activist, co-founded The Wilderness Society (d. 1939)
1902 – Dan Keating, Irish Republican Army volunteer (d. 2007)
1903 – Kane Tanaka, Japanese Supercentenarian, Oldest Japanese person ever, Second oldest verified person in world history (d. 2022)
1904 – Walter Heitler, German physicist and chemist (d. 1981)
1905 – Luigi Zampa, Italian director and screenwriter (d. 1991)
  1905   – Michael Tippett, English composer and conductor (d. 1998)
1909 – Barry Goldwater, American politician, businessman, and author (d. 1998)
  1909   – Riccardo Cassin, Italian mountaineer and author (d. 2009)
1913 – Anna Lee, English-American actress (d. 2004)
  1913   – Juanita Jackson Mitchell, American lawyer and activist (d. 1992)
1917 – Vera Zorina, German-Norwegian actress and dancer (d. 2003)
1918 – Willi Graf, German physician and activist (d. 1943)
1919 – Ernest Bender, American Indologist (d. 1996)
  1919   – Beatrice Hicks, American engineer (d. 1979)
1920 (probable) – Isaac Asimov, American writer and professor of biochemistry (d. 1992)
1921 – Glen Harmon, Canadian ice hockey player (d. 2007)
1926 – Gino Marchetti, American football player (d. 2019)
1928 – Dan Rostenkowski, American politician (d. 2010)
1929 – Tellervo Koivisto, Finnish politician, former First Lady of Finland
1931 – Toshiki Kaifu, Japanese lawyer and politician, 76th Prime Minister of Japan (d. 2022)
1934 – John Hollowbread, English footballer, goalkeeper (d. 2007) 
1936 – Roger Miller, American singer-songwriter, musician, and actor (d. 1992)
1938 – David Bailey, English photographer and painter
  1938   – Lynn Conway, American computer scientist and electrical engineer
  1938   – Robert Smithson, American sculptor and photographer (d. 1973)
1940 – Jim Bakker, American televangelist
  1940   – Saud bin Faisal bin Abdulaziz Al Saud, Saudi Arabian economist and politician, Saudi Arabian Minister of Foreign Affairs (d. 2015) 
1942 – Dennis Hastert, American educator and politician, 59th Speaker of the United States House of Representatives
  1942   – Thomas Hammarberg, Swedish lawyer and diplomat
1943 – Janet Akyüz Mattei, Turkish-American astronomer (d. 2004)
1944 – Charlie Davis, Trinidadian cricketer
  1944   – Norodom Ranariddh, Cambodian field marshal and politician, 1st Prime Minister of Cambodia (d. 2021)
  1944   – Péter Eötvös, Hungarian composer and conductor
1947 – Calvin Hill, American football player
  1947   – David Shapiro, American poet, historian, and critic
  1947   – Jack Hanna, American zoologist and author
1949 – Christopher Durang, American playwright and screenwriter
  1949   – Iris Marion Young, American political scientist and academic (d. 2006)
1952 – Indulis Emsis, Latvian biologist and politician, 9th Prime Minister of Latvia
1954 – Henry Bonilla, American broadcaster and politician
  1954   – Évelyne Trouillot, Haitian playwright and author
1961 – Craig James, American football player and sportscaster
  1961   – Gabrielle Carteris, American actress
  1961   – Paula Hamilton, English model 
  1961   – Robert Wexler, American lawyer and politician
1963 – David Cone, American baseball player and sportscaster
  1963   – Edgar Martínez, American baseball player
1964 – Pernell Whitaker, American boxer (d. 2019)
1965 – Francois Pienaar, South African rugby player
1967 – Jón Gnarr, Icelandic actor and politician; 20th Mayor of Reykjavík
  1967   – Tia Carrere, American actress
1968 – Anky van Grunsven, Dutch dressage champion
  1968   – Cuba Gooding, Jr., American actor and producer
1969 – Christy Turlington, American model
  1969   – István Bagyula, Hungarian pole vaulter
  1969   – William Fox-Pitt, English horse rider and journalist
1970 – Eric Whitacre, American composer and conductor
1971 – Renée Elise Goldsberry, American actress
  1971   – Taye Diggs, American actor and singer
1972 – Mattias Norström, Swedish ice hockey player and manager
  1972   – Rodney MacDonald, Canadian educator and politician, 26th Premier of Nova Scotia
  1972   – Shiraz Minwalla, Indian theoretical physicist and string theorist
1974 – Ludmila Formanová, Czech runner
  1974   – Tomáš Řepka, Czech footballer
1975 – Reuben Thorne, New Zealand rugby player
  1975  – Dax Shepard, American actor
1977 – Brian Boucher, American ice hockey player and sportscaster
  1977   – Stefan Koubek, Austrian tennis player
1979 – Jonathan Greening, English footballer
1981 – Maxi Rodríguez, Argentinian footballer
1983 – Kate Bosworth, American actress
1987 – Robert Milsom, English footballer
1988 – Damien Tussac, French-German rugby player
1992 – Paulo Gazzaniga, Argentinian footballer
  1992   – Korbin Sims, Australian-Fijian rugby league player 
1993 – Bryson Tiller, American singer and rapper
1998 – Timothy Fosu-Mensah, Dutch footballer
1999 – Fernando Tatís Jr., American baseball player

Deaths

Pre-1600
 951 – Liu Chengyou, Emperor Yin of the Later Han
   951   – Su Fengji, Chinese official and chancellor
1096 – William de St-Calais, Bishop of Durham and chief counsellor of William II of England
1169 – Bertrand de Blanchefort, sixth Grand Master of the Knights Templar (b. c. 1109)
1184 – Theodora Komnene, Duchess of Austria, daughter of Andronikos Komnenos
1298 – Lodomer, Hungarian prelate, Archbishop of Esztergom
1470 – Heinrich Reuß von Plauen, Grand Master of the Teutonic Order  
1512 – Svante Nilsson, Sweden politician (b. 1460)
1514 – William Smyth, English bishop and academic (b. 1460)
1543 – Francesco Canova da Milano, Italian composer (b. 1497)
1557 – Pontormo, Italian painter and educator (b. 1494)

1601–1900
1613 – Salima Sultan Begum, Empress of the Mughal Empire (b. 1539)
1614 – Luisa Carvajal y Mendoza, Spanish mystical poet and Catholic martyr (b. 1566)
1726 – Domenico Zipoli, Italian organist and composer (b. 1688)
1763 – John Carteret, 2nd Earl Granville, English statesman (b. 1690)
1850 – Manuel de la Peña y Peña, Mexican lawyer and 20th President (1847) (b. 1789) 
1861 – Frederick William IV of Prussia (b. 1795)
1892 – George Biddell Airy, English mathematician and astronomer (b. 1801)

1901–present
1904 – James Longstreet, American general and diplomat (b. 1821)
1913 – Léon Teisserenc de Bort, French meteorologist (b. 1855)
1915 – Karl Goldmark, Hungarian violinist and composer (b. 1830)
1917 – Léon Flameng, French cyclist (b. 1877) 
1920 – Paul Adam, French author (b. 1862)
1924 – Sabine Baring-Gould, English author and scholar (b. 1834)
1939 – Roman Dmowski, Polish politician, Polish Minister of Foreign Affairs (b. 1864)
1941 – Mischa Levitzki, Russian-American pianist and composer (b. 1898)
1946 – Joe Darling, Australian cricketer and politician (b. 1870) 
1950 – James Dooley, Irish-Australian politician, 21st Premier of New South Wales (b. 1877)
1951 – William Campion, English colonel and politician, 21st Governor of Western Australia (b. 1870)
  1951   – Edith New, English militant suffragette (b. 1877)
1953 – Guccio Gucci, Italian businessman and fashion designer, founder of Gucci (b. 1881)
1960 – Paul Sauvé, Canadian lawyer and politician, 17th Premier of Quebec (b. 1907)
1963 – Dick Powell, American actor, singer, and director (b. 1904)
  1963   – Jack Carson, Canadian-American actor (b. 1910)
1974 – Tex Ritter, American actor (b. 1905)
1975 – Siraj Sikder, Bangladesh revolutionary leader (b. 1944)
1977 – Erroll Garner, American pianist and composer (b. 1921)
1986 – Una Merkel, American actress (b. 1903)
1987 – Harekrushna Mahatab, Indian journalist and politician, 1st Chief Minister of Odisha (b. 1899)
1989 – Safdar Hashmi, Indian actor, director, and playwright (b. 1954)
1990 – Alan Hale Jr., American film and television actor (b. 1921)
  1990   – Evangelos Averoff, Greek historian and politician, Greek Minister for National Defence (b. 1910)
1994 – Dixy Lee Ray, American biologist and politician; 17th Governor of Washington (b. 1914)
  1994   – Pierre-Paul Schweitzer, French lawyer and businessman (b. 1915)
1995 – Nancy Kelly, American actress (b. 1921)
  1995   – Siad Barre, Somalian general and politician; 3rd President of Somalia (b. 1919)
1999 – Rolf Liebermann, Swiss-French composer and manager (b. 1910)
  1999   – Sebastian Haffner, German journalist and author (b. 1907)
2000 – Elmo Zumwalt, American admiral (b. 1920)
  2000   – Patrick O'Brian, English author and translator (b. 1914)
2001 – William P. Rogers, American lieutenant, lawyer, and politician, 55th United States Secretary of State (b. 1913)
2005 – Maclyn McCarty, American geneticist and physician (b. 1911)
2006 – Cecilia Muñoz-Palma, Filipino lawyer and jurist (b. 1913)
  2006   – Osa Massen, Danish-American actress (b. 1914) 
2007 – A. Richard Newton, Australian-American engineer and academic (b. 1951)
  2007   – Elizabeth Fox-Genovese, American historian and author (b. 1941)
  2007   – Teddy Kollek, Hungarian-Israeli politician, Mayor of Jerusalem (b. 1911)
2008 – George MacDonald Fraser, Scottish journalist and author (b. 1925)
  2008   – Lee S. Dreyfus, American sailor, academic, and politician, 40th Governor of Wisconsin (b. 1926)
2009 – Inger Christensen, Danish poet and author (b. 1935)
  2009   – Dnyaneshwar Agashe, Indian businessman and cricketer (b. 1942)
2010 – David R. Ross, Scottish historian and author (b. 1958)
2011 – Anne Francis, American actress (b. 1930)
  2011   – Bali Ram Bhagat, Indian politician; 16th Governor of Rajasthan (b. 1922)
  2011   – Pete Postlethwaite, English actor (b. 1946)
2012 – Gordon Hirabayashi, American-Canadian sociologist and academic (b. 1918)
  2012   – Silvana Gallardo, American actress and producer (b. 1953)
  2012   – William P. Carey, American businessman and philanthropist, founded W. P. Carey (b. 1930)
2013 – Gerda Lerner, Austrian-American historian, author, and academic (b. 1920)
  2013   – Teresa Torańska, Polish journalist and author (b. 1944)
2014 – Bernard Glasser, American director and producer (b. 1924)
  2014   – Elizabeth Jane Howard, English author and screenwriter (b. 1923)
2015 – Tihomir Novakov, Serbian-American physicist and academic (b. 1929)
2016 – Ardhendu Bhushan Bardhan, Indian lawyer and politician (b. 1924)
  2016   – Frances Cress Welsing, American psychiatrist and author (b. 1935)
  2016   – Nimr al-Nimr, Saudi Arabian religious leader (b. 1959)
  2016   – Gisela Mota Ocampo, mayor of Temixco, Morelos, Mexico, assassinated (b. 1982)
2017 – Jean Vuarnet, French ski racer (b. 1933)
  2017   – John Berger, English art critic, novelist and painter (b. 1926)
2018 – Guida Maria, Portuguese actress (b. 1950) 
  2018   – Thomas S. Monson, American religious leader, 16th president of the Church of Jesus Christ of Latter-day Saints (b. 1927)
2019 – Daryl Dragon, American musician (b. 1942)
  2019   – Bob Einstein, American actor and comedian (b. 1942)
  2019   – Gene Okerlund, American wrestling announcer (b. 1942)
2022 – Richard Leakey, Kenyan paleontologist and politician (b. 1944)
2023 – Ken Block, – American rally driver (b. 1967)

Holidays and observances
Ancestry Day (Haiti)
Berchtold's Day (Switzerland and Liechtenstein)
Carnival Day (Saint Kitts and Nevis)
Christian feast day:
Basil the Great (Catholic Church and Church of England)
Defendens of Thebes
Earliest day on which the Feast of the Holy Name of Jesus is observed, while January 5 is the latest; celebrated on Sunday between January 2 and 5. (Roman Catholic Church, 1960 calendar)
Gregory of Nazianzus (Catholic Church)
Johann Konrad Wilhelm Löhe (Lutheran Church)
Macarius of Alexandria
Seraphim of Sarov (repose) (Eastern Orthodox Church)
Vedanayagam Samuel Azariah (Episcopal Church)
January 2 (Eastern Orthodox liturgics)
Nyinlong (Bhutan)
The first day of Blacks and Whites' Carnival, celebrated until January 7. (southern Colombia)
The first day of the Carnival of Riosucio, celebrated until January 8 every 2 years. (Riosucio)
The ninth of the Twelve Days of Christmas (Western Christianity)
The second day of New Year (a holiday in Kazakhstan, North Macedonia, Mauritius, Montenegro, New Zealand, Romania, Russia, Slovenia, Switzerland, Ukraine):
New Year Holiday (Scotland), if it is a Sunday, the day moves to January 3
Kaapse Klopse (Cape Town, South Africa)
Victory of Armed Forces Day (Cuba)

References

External links

 BBC: On This Day
 
 Historical Events on January 2

Days of the year
January